Leone Cortese (died 1496) was a Roman Catholic prelate who served as Bishop of Acerra (1452–1496).

Biography
On 2 October 1452, Leone Cortese was appointed by Pope Nicholas V as Bishop of Acerra. He served as Bishop of Acerra until his death in 1496.

Episcopal succession
While bishop, he was the principal co-consecrator of: 
Oliviero Carafa, Archbishop of Naples (1458); and 
Scipione Cicinelli, Archbishop of Sorrento (1470).

References

External links and additional sources
 (for Chronology of Bishops) 
 (for Chronology of Bishops) 

15th-century Italian Roman Catholic bishops
Bishops appointed by Pope Nicholas V
1496 deaths